Crossroads is a multisite interdenominational megachurch in Cincinnati, Ohio. It was named the 4th largest and fastest growing church in America in 2017, with over 34,000 average weekend attendees. Crossroads has 10 physical locations in Ohio and Kentucky, and an online streaming platform where over 6,000 people watch services weekly.

History
In 1990, Procter & Gamble brand managers Brian Wells, Jim Bechtold and Vivienne Bechtold started a singles Bible study in Hyde Park, Cincinnati. It quickly grew to over 100 people and they wondered if starting a church made sense.

After five years in the junior high auditorium and a growing attendance, senior leaders raised funds to purchase an empty supercenter. It was renovated into an auditorium seating 1,200. The construction was done by Megen Construction Company, completed a month ahead of schedule within budget. 

Champlin Architecture did the architecture for the first renovation with Megen Construction, and also did work for the second phase. Phase two expanded the auditorium, tripled the size of the childcare facility, and modernized the design. The new design is “raw, edgy, contemporary.”

Beliefs 
The church is considered interdenominational, although some on staff refer to it as evangelical. The core beliefs pull from a variety of Christian denominations and generally the church favors a more literal interpretation of biblical texts. The church is classified as Non-Affirming with their LGBTQ policy, and the Senior Pastor Brian Tome has indicated that homosexuality is a sin. The church also opposes abortion, and supports local anti-abortion organizations such as the Eve Center.

Locations
Crossroads has 10 of their own buildings, each with a campus pastor, including Crossroad's online location, Crossroads Anywhere. Crossroads also has a presence in 6 other cities, where people gather in rented spaces or homes.

List of Crossroads locations and cities:
Columbus, OH
Dayton (Bellbrook)
East Side (Cincinnati)
Florence, KY
Georgetown, KY
Lexington, KY
Mason, OH
Oakley (Cincinnati)
Uptown (Cincinnati)
West Side (Cincinnati)
Eastgate (Cincinnati)
Anywhere (online)

Undivided
Undivided is a six-week program designed to encourage candid discussions around racial issues in small groups of people of different ethnicities. The initiative was launched out of the Crossroads Oakley campus and has grown across other Crossroads sites. As of June 2018, 3,000 people have gone through the program.

On June 12, 2018, the Undivided program received national attention when Crossroads Oakley's community pastor Chuck Mingo was on the front page of the USA Today for his work launching the program.

Pastors
 Brian Tome (Senior Pastor)
 Kyle Ranson (Online)
 Vicki Diller (Columbus)
 Andy Reider (Dayton)
 Lena Schuler (East Side)
 Terry Phillips (Florence)
 Griff Ray (Georgetown)
 John Gillispie (Lexington)
 Tim Senff (Mason)
 Greg McElfresh (Oakley)
 Josh Wade (Uptown)
 Matt Castleman (West Side)

References

Churches in Cincinnati
Megachurches in the United States